Badaplin War is an Indian professor and a litterateur. In 2022, she was awarded the Padma Shri by the Indian Government for her contribution in literature and education.

Early life and education
War did her PhD in Linguistics from the University of London, United Kingdom.

Career
War joined the Department of Khasi as a lecturer in 1983 and got promoted to a Reader in 1996 and became a professor in 2001. She  taught Linguistic Anthropology at NEHU from 1994 to 1996. She also taught General Linguistics, Morphology, Semantics at NEHU from 1996 to 1998. She also taught two courses at Shillong Regional Centre in 1995 and 2003. She is the founder president of Society for Khasi Studies and a member of the Khasi Author's Society. She has written nine books on Khasi language and linguistics.

Awards
Padma Shri in 2022

References

Living people
Recipients of the Padma Shri in literature & education
Year of birth missing (living people)